Aerenea sulcicollis is a species of beetle in the family Cerambycidae. It was described by Melzer in 1932.

Subspecies
 Aerenea sulcicollis subsulcicollis Breuning, 1948
 Aerenea sulcicollis sulcicollis Melzer, 1932

References

Compsosomatini
Beetles described in 1932